JCF may refer to:

 Code of G. Robert Cotton Correctional Facility, a Michigan state prison
 Jaguar Conservation Fund
 Jamaica Constabulary Force, police
 James Caan Foundation
 Japan Chernobyl Foundation, a Japanese NPO
 Japan Cycling Federation
 A series of Victorian Railways hopper wagons
 Jordan canonical form of a matrix in mathematics
 Joseph Campbell Foundation, US